CineExport is a plug-in for Apple Compressor used to convert Final Cut Pro sequences and popular media formats to DCI compliant Digital Cinema Packages (DCP) by Doremi Labs. Using the powerful CineAsset encoding engine, CineExport can be used to create JPEG2000 DCP's in the XYZ color space. MPEG-2 and H.264 encoded DCP's can also be created for alternative content and compatible players. Standard and Pro versions are available allowing creation of 2D and 3D DCP's at up to 4K resolution. The Pro version allows the generation of encrypted DCP's along with KDM generation for encrypted content. DCP's created by CineExport are compatible with any standard digital cinema server.

Features

 Easily convert popular video formats to DCP
 Easily convert Final Cut Pro sequences to DCP
 Compatible with all formats supported by Compressor 3.5.3 and 4.0
 Standard and Pro versions available
 XYZ Colorspace Conversion
 Adjust frame rate
 Uses Digital Cinema Naming Convention
 Stereoscopic support
 Custom Luts and Matrix values for color conversion (.csv and .3dl files)
 High Frame Rate support, up to 96 fps
 Adjust resolution (up to 4K supported)
 Create DCP's with subtitles
 Interop and SMPTE packaging formats supported
 Certificate Manager
 Generate encrypted DCP's (Pro version only)
 Generate KDM's for encrypted content (Pro version only)

Supported Output Format

JPEG2000 Digital Cinema Package

 2D and 3D at up to 4K resolution
 Bit Rate up to 250 Mbit/s (500Mbit/s for frame rates above 30 fps)
 XYZ (YCxCz for 3D) Color Conversion

MPEG2 Digital Cinema Package

 I-Only or Long GOP
 1080p up to 80 Mbit/s

H.264 Digital Cinema Package

 1080p up to 50 Mbit/s

See also 
 Doremi Labs
 CineAsset
 CinePlayer
 Comparison of DCP creation tools
 Non-linear video editing
 List of video editing software
 Comparison of video editing software

External links 
 CineExport: Product page
 CineExport: User Manual
 Download CineExport (evaluation version)
 Doremi Labs website

Video editing software
Video editing software for macOS
Film and video technology
Dolby Laboratories